The 12639 / 12640 Brindavan Express is a Superfast express train connecting MGR Chennai Central (MAS) and KSR Bengaluru City Jn (SBC). It leaves MGR Chennai Central at 07:40 and reaches KSR Bengalur at 13:40 hours. In the reverse direction, it leaves KSR Bengaluru at 15:00 and reaches MGR Chennai Central at 21:05 hours. The train has 22 coaches in its composition

History
This train introduced in the 1964  as the first intercity express in the Southern Railways. Later due to derailments of some trains the speed was reduced to take 5.5 hours in the 1980s. With increase in stops it has now come to 6 hours. In the early  1980s the train was operated as double decker with ac and non-ac classes, which was later on scrapped, and the train was operated as single deck. In the late 1980s the MAS-JTJ stretch was electrified. JTJ-SBC the train used diesel engines. For the purpose of speed this train used to have twin diesels for the up gradient (deccan) between JTJ and SBC. The Train celebrated its Golden Jubilee run on 1 October 2014.

Loco Link 
This train is currently hauled by WAP-4, WAP-7 class electric locomotive maintained by Electric Loco Shed Arakkonam, Royapuram of Southern Railway

Train Timings

This train is a daily service train with the following departures and arrivals at some of these stations:-

Rakes

Earlier with ICF coaches, the train had dedicated rake. Upon launch of LHB coach, the rakes are now shared with Kovai Express (12675/12676).
 3 Second Class Sitting (Unreserved)
 13 Second-Class Sitting (Reserved)
 2 AC Chair Car
 1 Pantry Car
 1 EOG
 1 LSLRD

References

External links 

Transport in Bangalore
Transport in Chennai
Named passenger trains of India
Express trains in India
Rail transport in Karnataka
Rail transport in Tamil Nadu
Rail transport in Andhra Pradesh
Railway services introduced in 1964